Cochise is the debut album from the British rock band Cochise.

Cover art
The cover art, a nude female breast, was designed by Hipgnosis.

Reception

Richie Unterberger of Allmusic wrote that Cochise "treads an uneasy line between eclectic diversity and a lack of direction" and is "distinguished just slightly by a more country-ish flavor than the norm [early 1970s British rock], courtesy of Cole's pedal steel".  He goes on to call the sound "a wistful rural feel to parts of the material that suggests some promise" but refers to "Painted Lady" and "Moment and the End" as "tense, meandering hard rock tunes" and the cover version of Simon & Garfunkel's "59th Street Bridge Song" "an unnecessary, pedestrian heavy rock cover".

Track listing
"Velvet Mountain" (Mick Grabham) – 3:26
"China" (Grabham)–3:55
"Trafalgar Day" (B. J. Cole) – 5:08
"Moment and the End" (Cole) – 5:58
"Watch This Space" (Stewart Brown) – 3:56
"59th Street Bridge Song (Feelin' Groovy)" (Paul Simon) – 3:39
"Past Loves" (Brown) – 3:38
"Painted Lady" (Grabham) – 7:03
"Black Is the Colour" (Traditional) 0:56 (this track is not on the UK version)

Personnel
Cochise
Stewart Brown – lead vocals, acoustic guitar
B.J. Cole –pedal steel guitar, dobro, cello
Mick Grabham – lead and acoustic guitars, piano, organ, backing vocals
Rick Wills – bass, backing vocals
John "Sly" Wilson – drums, percussion, backing vocals 
Technical
Hipgnosis – photography, cover design
John Stewart – engineer
Hugh Fielder – liner notes

Release history

References

Cochise (band) albums
1970 debut albums
Albums with cover art by Hipgnosis
United Artists Records albums